Hamid Ismail Hassan Khalifa Hamid1 is a Qatari footballer of Sudanese descent who can play at right back and on the right wing. He currently plays for Al-Arabi of the Qatar Stars League and the Qatar national football team.

Club career
Ismail joined Al Rayyan in the 2009 winter transfer window. He has been used mostly as a utility player, usually playing as a right back but has also started some matches as a winger, midfielder and striker. In 2011, he renewed his contract with Al Rayyan for 3 years, despite interest from El Jaish SC.

Ismail was elected for the Best Player Award by the QFA for the 2010/11 season along with three others, but eventually lost out to Bakari Koné.

International career

In 2008, after good performances at club he was called up the Qatar national football team. In December 2010 he was included in Bruno Metsu's 23 players to represent Qatar at home in the 2011 AFC Asian Cup. He started the opening game against Uzbekistan in the Khalifa International Stadium where Qatar lost 2–0.

Honours

Club
Al-Arabi
Sheikh Jassim Cup: 2008

Al Rayyan
Emir of Qatar Cup: 2010, 2011

Al-Sadd
Qatar Stars League: 2018–19
Emir of Qatar Cup: 2014, 2017
Sheikh Jassim Cup: 2014
Qatar Cup: 2017

International
AFC Asian Cup: 2019

Personal
Ismail comes from a footballing family. His father is a former football player, both of his brothers play for Qatari clubs, and his two sisters are members of the Qatar women's national football team. He is nicknamed "Hamoudi" by his family.

Ismail's future plans were to become a legal consultant, but he was no longer able to study full-time due to his football career.

References

Note
This is an Arabic patronymic name, there is no surname.

External links

1986 births
Living people
Qatari footballers
Qatar international footballers
Al-Arabi SC (Qatar) players
Al-Rayyan SC players
Al Sadd SC players
Qatar SC players
2011 AFC Asian Cup players
2019 AFC Asian Cup players
Qatar Stars League players
Qatari Second Division players
Qatari people of Sudanese descent
Sudanese emigrants to Qatar
Naturalised citizens of Qatar
Footballers at the 2010 Asian Games
Association football fullbacks
AFC Asian Cup-winning players
Asian Games competitors for Qatar
2019 Copa América players